The 2011 Belarusian Women's Cup was the twentieth edition of the competition. It was won for the first time by FK Minsk after beating Viktoria Voronovo, Nadezhda Mogilev and, finally, defending champions Zorka Minsk.

Results

Preliminary round

|}

Quarterfinals

|}

Semifinals

|}

Final

References
 Results in the Football Federation of Belarus' website

Belarusian Women's Cup, 2011
Women's Football Cup, 2011